Maud Seamount is a seamount in the Southern Ocean. Its name was approved by the Advisory Committee for Undersea Features in February 1964.

References

Seamounts of the Southern Ocean
Landforms of Queen Maud Land